Reading v Attorney-General [1951] UKHL 1 is an English trusts law case, concerning constructive trusts.

Facts
Mr Reading was stationed in Egypt as an army sergeant. Smugglers paid him to ride in their lorries, while they were doing their smuggling of illegal spirits (whisky and brandy), while visibly wearing his army uniform, hence making a search less likely. Mr Reading got between £1000 and £4000 each time, but was caught. The Crown seized the money he was paid, £19,325 4s 8d in total, and put him in prison. Mr Reading claimed that the money should be returned under an action for money had and received. The Crown argued it was entitled to retain the sums, which must have been received in "trust" for the Crown.

Judgment
The House of Lords held that the Crown could retain the money for many reasons, including that Mr Reading was in a fiduciary position. He was required to give up all unauthorised profits to his principal, the Crown. Lord Porter said the following.

See also

English trusts law
English land law
English property law

Notes

References

English trusts case law
House of Lords cases
1951 in British law
1951 in case law